The women's 400 metres event at the 2005 Summer Universiade was held on 15–17 August in Izmir, Turkey.

Medalists

Results

Heats

Semifinals

Final

References
Full results
Heats results
Semifinals results
Final results

Athletics at the 2005 Summer Universiade
2005 in women's athletics
2005